A beheading video is a form of propaganda or snuff video in which hostages are graphically decapitated. It is often employed by groups seeking to instill shock or terror into a population. Although beheading has been a widely employed public execution method since the ancient Greeks and Romans, videos of this type only began to arise in 2002 with the beheading of Daniel Pearl and the growth of the Internet in the Information Age, which allowed groups to anonymously publish these videos for public consumption. The beheadings shown in these videos are usually not performed in a "classical" method – decapitating a victim quickly with a blow from a sword or axe – but by the relatively slow and torturous process of slicing and sawing the victim's neck, while still alive, with a knife. Despite the number of groups and ideologies that employ this form of propaganda, the process is overwhelmingly associated with Islamist extremists.

History

The first beheading by the National Movement for the Restoration of Pakistani Sovereignty was of Daniel Pearl in 2002. The videos were popularized in 2004 by Abu Musab al-Zarqawi, a radical Islamic militant.

The videos caused controversy among Islamic scholars, some of whom denounced them as against Islamic law; al-Qaeda did not approve and Osama bin Laden considered them poor public relations. Regardless, they became popular with certain Islamic terrorist groups, such as the Islamic State of Iraq and the Levant.

Early videos were grainy and unsophisticated, but, according to the Chicago Sun-Times, had by 2004 been "growing in sophistication, using animated graphics and editing techniques apparently aimed at embellishing the audio to make a victim's final moments seem more disturbing". These videos are often uploaded to the World Wide Web by terrorists, then discussed and distributed by web-based outlets, such as blogs, shock sites, and traditional journalistic media. After a beheading video by a Mexican drug cartel spread virally on Facebook, the Family Online Safety Institute petitioned to have it removed. Initially, Facebook refused to remove the video, then did so, and subsequently clarified their policies, stating that beheading videos would only be allowed if posted in a manner intended for its users to "condemn" the acts.

Writing in The Atlantic, Simon Cottee drew a comparison between jihadist videos and gonzo pornography.

Videos released

1996-1999
 An unidentified Russian soldier beheaded in 1996 in Chechnya by resistance fighters
 One officer and five enlisted men in the Russian military were decapitated on film during the Tukhchar massacre on September 5th, 1999.

2002 
 Daniel Pearl, U.S. citizen, beheaded February 1, 2002, in Pakistan by al-Qaeda jihadists
 A video (published in July 2002 by the FSB) shows a woman being beheaded by alleged henchmen of Chechen commander Movsar Barayev

2004 
 Nick Berg, U.S. citizen, beheaded May 7, 2004, in Iraq by Muntada al-Ansar jihadists
 Paul Marshall Johnson, Jr., U.S. citizen, beheaded in June 2004 in Saudi Arabia by al-Qaeda jihadists
 Kim Sun-il, South Korean citizen, beheaded in June 2004 in Iraq by jihadists of Jama'at al-Tawhid wal-Jihad (JTJ)
 Georgi Lazov, Bulgarian citizen, beheaded in July 2004 in Iraq by JTJ jihadists
 Mohammed Mutawalli, Egyptian citizen, beheaded in August 2004 in Iraq by JTJ jihadists
 One Nepali citizen, beheaded in August 2004 in Iraq by JTJ jihadists
 Eugene Armstrong, U.S. citizen, beheaded in September 2004 in Iraq by JTJ jihadists
 Jack Hensley, U.S. citizen, beheaded in September 2004 in Iraq by JTJ jihadists
 Kenneth Bigley, British citizen, beheaded on October 7, 2004 in Iraq by JTJ jihadists
 Shosei Koda, Japanese citizen, beheaded on October 29, 2004, in Iraq by jihadists of al-Qaeda in Iraq

2005–2013 
 Shamil Odamanov, Russian citizen of Dagestani descent. Odamanov was beheaded in 2007 by Russian neo-Nazis.
 Nikolay Melnik, Kazakhstani citizen, beheaded July 18, 2008, in Podyachevo, Russia by his fellow neo-Nazi Konstantin Nikiforenko of the NSO-North
 Piotr Stańczak, Polish citizen, beheaded on February 7, 2009, in Pakistan by Tehreek-e-Taliban jihadists
 A Tunisian man was beheaded for converting to Christianity

2014 
 Aytemir Salimgereev, Russian citizen, beheaded in July 2014 in Russia by Vilayat Dagestan jihadists
 James Foley, U.S. citizen, beheaded August 19, 2014, south of Raqqa, Syria by jihadists of the Islamic State of Iraq and the Levant (ISIL)
 Four Egyptians, beheaded in August 2014 in Sheikh Zuweid, by Ansar Bait al-Maqdis jihadists
 Steven Sotloff, U.S. citizen, beheaded in August 2014, south of Raqqa, Syria by ISIL jihadists
 David Cawthorne Haines, U.K. citizen, beheaded in September 2014 in Syria by ISIL jihadists
 Hervé Gourdel, French citizen, beheaded in September 2014, east of Algiers, Algeria by Jund al-Khilafah jihadists supporting ISIL
 Alan Henning, U.K. citizen, beheaded in October 2014, in Syria by ISIL jihadists
 Peter Kassig, U.S, citizen beheaded in November 2014, in Dabiq, Aleppo, Syria by ISIL jihadists
Eighteen Syrian soldiers of the Syrian Arab Army, beheaded in November 2014, in Dabiq, Aleppo, Syria by ISIL jihadists

2015 
Haruna Yukawa, Japanese citizen, beheaded in January 2015 by ISIL jihadists.
Kenji Goto, Japanese citizen, beheaded in January 2015 near Raqqa, Syria, by ISIL jihadists.
Twenty-one Egyptian Coptic Christians, beheaded in February 2015 near Tripoli, Libya, by ISIL jihadists
Twenty-eight Ethiopian Christians, beheaded in Libya in April 2015 by ISIL jihadists
A video (article published July 2015) shows a boy executing a Syrian Arab Army soldier using a knife, while within Palmyra
Four Kurdish Peshmerga members, beheaded in Iraq in October 2015 by ISIL jihadists

2016 
John Ridsdel and Robert Hall, Canadian citizens, beheaded in April 2016 and June 2016 respectively in the Philippines by Abu Sayyaf jihadists.
Abdullah Tayseer Al Issa, Palestinian citizen, beheaded in July 2016 in Syria by Nour al-Din al-Zenki Movement rebels, allegedly of the Liwa al-Quds: this incident precipitated the end of Timber Sycamore in Syria

2017
Jürgen Kantner, German citizen, beheaded in March 2017 in the Philippines by Abu Sayyaf jihadists.
Muhammad "Hamadi" Abdullah al-Ismail, Syrian citizen who allegedly deserted the Syrian Arab Army, tortured with a sledgehammer and beheaded near the al-Shaer oil fields, Homs Governorate, Syria (the first footage appeared online in June 2017) by Russian mercenaries linked to the Wagner Group

2018
 A young man was decapitated by Tirso Meleán gang after robbing a ranch
 Louisa Vesterager Jespersen, Danish citizen, and Maren Ueland, Norwegian citizen, beheaded in December 2018, in Morocco by alleged ISIL jihadists

2019
Ayafor Florence, Cameroonian citizen who worked as a wardress at the Bamenda Central Prison, beheaded on September 29, 2019 in Pinyin, Northwest Region, Cameroon by Ambazonian militants

2021
An Afghan soldier was killed by the Taliban before they filmed a video showing his severed head being held by his hair.
An Egyptian man beheaded a victim and wandered in the street while holding up the severed head in broad daylight.

2022
Murder of Kanhaiya Lal, a Hindu tailor was murdered during an attempted beheading following the 2022 Muhammad remarks controversy in India. The two Muslim perpetrators recorded themselves committing the crime but fled from the scene after slicing the victim's throat.

Hoax 
A hoax beheading video filmed by Benjamin Vanderford, Robert Martin, and Laurie Kirchner in 2004 received wide attention by the American press. The video used Jama'at al-Tawhid wal-Jihad's logo, but not the group's flag. It was originally filmed for Vanderford's local election campaign. He was seeking Matt Gonzalez's seat on the San Francisco Board of Supervisors. Vanderford's second intention was to point out how uncritically the mainstream media would accept an anonymous video. The Islamic Global Media Center claimed to have made the video, but removed it from their website after the hoax was discovered. The video also appeared on other militant websites and was broadcast on Arabic television.

See also 

 ISIL beheading incidents
 Decapitation
 Beheading in Islam
 Martyrdom video
 Snuff film
 Livestreamed crime
 The Beatles (terrorist cell)

References

External links 
 "Ben Vanderford Hoax Video" - Spike TV
 Jones, Ronald H. "Terrorist Beheadings: Cultural and Strategic Implications". Hosted at Air University

Beheading videos

Propaganda techniques by medium
Psychological warfare techniques
Terrorism tactics
Jihadist propaganda